The Life of Christ is a series of seven paintings in tempera and gold on panel, attributed to Giotto and dating to around 1320–1325. Depicting the Nativity and Passion of Christ, and Pentecost, they are now housed in a number of museums: three are in the Alte Pinakothek in Munich, and the Metropolitan Museum of Art in New York, the Isabella Stewart Gardner Museum in Boston, the Berenson Collection in Settignano and the National Gallery in London all have one each.

List

Bibliography

External links

1320s paintings
Paintings by Giotto
Giotto
Giotto
Giotto
Giotto
Giotto
Paintings in the collection of the Metropolitan Museum of Art
Collections of the National Gallery, London
Collection of the Alte Pinakothek
Paintings in the collection of the Isabella Stewart Gardner Museum
Paintings in the Berenson collection
Giotto